Pariancillo Villa is one of the constituent barangays in the city of Valenzuela, Metro Manila, Philippines.

Pariancillo Villa was widely believed to be a cemetery for priests during the Spanish colonization of the Philippines. It is also the birthplace of Pío Valenzuela.

Festivals
Residents celebrate a town fiesta celebration every November 12 for their patron saint, San Diego de Alcala.

Landmarks

The settlement is mostly a residential area. One of the known sites in the barangay is the Pariancillo Villa Day Care Center.

References

External links

Valenzuela, Philippines official site

Barangays of Metro Manila
Valenzuela, Metro Manila